Musi may refer to:

 Musi River (Indonesia)
 Musi River (India), Telangana
 Moosy River, Andhra Pradesh, India
 Musi language, a Malay language spoken in Indonesia
 Angelo Musi (1918–2009), American basketball player
 Agostino de' Musi, real name of Agostino Veneziano (c. 1490–c. 1540), Italian engraver
 Mitsubishi UFJ Securities International (MUSI), a global investment bank based in London

See also
Mussi
Musy